
Lago d'Origlio is a lake in the municipality of Origlio, in Ticino, Switzerland.

Palaeobotanics studied the core of the lake sediment and discovered charcoal deposits as well as cereal pollen and invasive weeds, pointing to the first agricultural activities between 7,500 and 5,000 years ago, when people burned forests to clear space for farmland and pastures.

References

Origlio